Ugol is a rural locality (a village) in Shemogodskoye Rural Settlement, Velikoustyugsky District, Vologda Oblast, Russia. The population was 11 as of 2002.

Geography 
Ugol is located 24 km northeast of Veliky Ustyug (the district's administrative centre) by road. Kozlovo is the nearest rural locality.

References 

Rural localities in Velikoustyugsky District